The 2007–08 UMass Minutemen basketball team represented the University of Massachusetts Amherst during the 2007–08 NCAA Division I men's basketball season. The Minutemen, led by third year head coach Travis Ford, played their home games at William D. Mullins Memorial Center and are members of the Atlantic 10 Conference. They finished the season 25-11, 10-6 in A-10 play to finish for third place.

Roster

Schedule

|-
!colspan=9| Exhibition

|-
!colspan=9| Regular Season

|-
!colspan=9| 2008 Atlantic 10 men's basketball tournament

|-
!colspan=9| 2008 NIT

References

UMass Minutemen basketball seasons
Umass
Umass
Umass
Umass